Drybrook Road is a closed station on the Cinderford to Coleford direct railway line in the Forest of Dean in Gloucestershire, near the village of Drybrook.  The former station was on the former Severn and Wye Railway system. It opened in 1875 and closed in 1929.

In the early 20th century the station was used to load timber from the local forest. In 1903 a coal train was involved in an accident at Drybrook.

Services

References

Disused railway stations in Gloucestershire
Former Severn and Wye Railway stations
Railway stations in Great Britain opened in 1875
Railway stations in Great Britain closed in 1929